The Ewe Creek Ranger Cabin No. 8, also known as Lower Savage River Cabin and Lower Savage Patrol Cabin, is a historic backcountry shelter in Denali National Park and Preserve. It is fashioned from peeled logs, with the gaps filled with moss, oakum, and chinking. The gable roof is corrugated metal. The cabin is one of four built by the National Park Service in the park in 1931. The cabin is used by rangers who patrol the park's backcountry.

The cabin was listed on the National Register of Historic Places in 1986.

References

Buildings and structures in Denali National Park and Preserve
Log cabins in the United States
National Register of Historic Places in Denali National Park and Preserve
Park buildings and structures on the National Register of Historic Places in Alaska
Log buildings and structures on the National Register of Historic Places in Alaska
1931 establishments in Alaska
Buildings and structures on the National Register of Historic Places in Denali Borough, Alaska